Manas County is a county in the Xinjiang Uyghur Autonomous Region under the administration of the Changji Hui Autonomous Prefecture.

The county seat is the old town of Manas, located on the Manasi River just east of Shihezi.

Manass has been called: "the biggest city (after Urumchi) in the biggest oasis on the biggest river of the North Road, and the chief centre of the T’ung-kan (Т′уң-кан, Dungan) population."

Climate

See also
1906 Manasi earthquake

References

Transport
Manas is served by China National Highway 312, the Northern Xinjiang and the Second Ürümqi-Jinghe Railways.

Notable persons
 Shewket Imin (:ug:شاۋكەت ئىمىن)

County-level divisions of Xinjiang
Changji Hui Autonomous Prefecture